Remember When may refer to:

Music
 "Remember When" (Alan Jackson song), 2003
 "Remember When (We Made These Memories)", a 1965 song by Wayne Newton
 "Remember When (Push Rewind)", a 2012 song by Chris Wallace
 "Remember When", a song by Color Me Badd
 "Remember When", a song by Avril Lavigne from Goodbye Lullaby
 "Remember When", a song written by Richard Marx and performed by LeAnn Rimes for Disney's Happiest Homecoming on Earth
 "Remember When" (The Platters song), a 1959 song written by Buck Ram
 Remember When (The Orwells album), 2012
 Remember When: The Anthology, a DVD of live performances by Harry Chapin
 "Remember When" (Bad Wolves song), a song by Bad Wolves on their 2018 album Disobey

Other media
 Remember When..., a 1980s TV series hosted by Dick Cavett
 Remember When, an imprint of the publisher Pen and Sword Books
 Remember When (film), a 1974 film with a screenplay by Herman Raucher
 Remember When: Reflections on a Changing Australia, a 2003 book by Bruce Elder
 Remember When (novel), a 2003 novel by Nora Roberts writing as J.D. Robb
 "Remember When" (The Sopranos), an episode of The Sopranos
 Remember When (radio program), a Philippine Musical Radio Program

See also 
 "Remember Then", a 1962 song first recorded by The Earls, originally written as "Remember When"
 Nostalgia